The Marseille tramway is a tramway system in Marseille, France. The current, modern Marseille tram network opened on 7 July 2007.

The first horse tramway opened in Marseille on 21 January 1876; electric trams came to Marseille in 1899. Unlike most other French cities, trams continued to operate in Marseille, even as through the 1950s and beyond trams disappeared from most cities around the world. The original tram system continued to operate until 2004, when the last line, Line 68, was closed. Trams remained out of operation for three years between 2004 and 2007, in advance of the effort to renovate the tram network to modern standards.

History

Historical tram network 
The first tram, horse drawn, ran in 1876 on Canebière. The electrification began in 1899 and preceded he delivery of new electric tramcars, all similar as to keep a consistent pool of cars. In 1905, a batch of bogie-tramcars was purchased, these were equipped with trailers and were used on suburban lines.

The system comprised purely urban lines and suburban lines, which stretched to outlying villages. Many tram lines joined in the centre of Marseille on the Canebière and harbour, resulting in headways of less than a minute in the centre city.

This huge network was modernised by the constant introduction of newer tramcars, to replace the older ones. In 1938, thirty-three trailers were recuperated from Paris. These meant that reversible convoys could be operated. In 1939, the tramway company owned and operated 430 tramcars and 350 trailers and 71 lines.

In 1943 a large project, never realised, was designed. This project planned to build large tunnels in the centre of Marseille. The busiest lines would join into two tunnels.
In 1949 a further modernisation occurred. The first articulated tramcars was designed and built (Algiers tramway possessed articulated SATRAMO tramcars). These were created by joining two older tramcars. These tramcars remained unique until 1985 when Nantes tramway opened.

Marseille city-council did not favour keeping its network of trams. Indeed, unorganised development of the car meant that modernisation and expansion of the tram network was hindered. The process of replacing tramways by trolleybuses and buses began after World War II in 1945 and accelerated from 1950. The first closures meant that Canebière was tramway-free from 1955. The last closure occurred on 21 January 1960.

Line 68 

Line 68 opened in December 1893 and is the only tramway line to remain in service during the later part of the twentieth century. Line 68 stretched from Noailles to Alhambra, serving La Plaine, the Boulevard Chave, the La Blancarde railway station and Saint-Pierre cemetery. The central terminus is situated in a tunnel. This tunnel, built in 1893, is unique in France and was built to give access to the city centre, avoiding the narrow streets of some of Marseilles's suburbs. Because of the problems involved in converting the line to bus use it was decided to keep the line operational.

Line 68 was modernised in 1969 with the introduction of twenty-one PCC tramcars and the whole track was relaid. The first of the PCC cars arrived on 26 December 1968 and the first tram went into service on 20 February 1969. The last of the old tramcars was withdrawn that spring. Modernisation resulted in an increase in passengers. Numbers increased from 4,917,000 passengers in 1968 to 5,239,000 in 1973.

Further modernisation was applied to the PCC cars in 1984. Three new cars were delivered and all cars made into double cars.

The line closed on Thursday, 8 January 2004 for reconstruction. The short section between La Blancarde and Saint Pierre was reopened as part of a new network on 30 June 2007. The section along Boulevard Chave to Eugène Pierre was due to reopen in October 2007; the tunnel to Noailles was due to reopen in summer 2008.

Modern tram network 

A new tram network is being built in Marseille, France, which when completed will consist of three tram lines. The first phase opened on 30 June 2007. It is part of an urban renewal project which aims to reduce automobile use and favour pedestrians, bicyclists, and public transit users.

Phase 1: Mid-2007 to Mid-2008 
On 30 June 2007, the first phase of the new Marseille tram network opened. It consists of one line linking Euroméditerranée in the northwest with Les Caillols in the east. Between Blancarde Chave and Saint-Pierre stations, it runs on part of the former Line 68.

In November 2007, the portion of the old Line 68 between Blancarde Chave. and E.-Pierre (near the entrance to the tunnel) reopened, and two lines were created. Line 1 links E.-Pierre and Les Caillols, and line 2 runs from Euroméditerranée to La Blancarde, where a transfer between the two lines was created.

La Blancarde train station is a transit hub: a station on Line 1 of the Marseille Metro opened in 2010, and it has long been served by TER regional trains to and from Toulon.

In September 2008, line 1 was extended to Noailles via the tunnel formerly used by line 68. This tunnel now carries a single track since the new trams are wider than the 68's PCC. In March 2010, line 2 was extended 700 meters north from Euroméditerranée-Gantes to Arenc.

Phase 2: 2011 
In May 2015, the  line 3 was inaugurated. It shares line 2 tracks between Arenc and la Canebière where line 2 turns west. Line 3 continues south on new track through Rue de Rome to Place Castellane. Line 3 extensions south,  to Dromel and la Gaye, and 2 km north to Geze are planned. Tram line 3 will therefore continue to run parallel to the Dromel-Castellane-Geze Metro line 2, which may limit its ridership.

Rolling stock 

Customized Bombardier Flexity Outlook trams are used on the new tram line. Twenty-six were delivered in 2007. In 2013, six new Flexity were ordered for the T3 line.

Their exterior and interior appearance was designed by MBD Design. The exterior resembles the hull of a ship, and the driver's cabin resembles the bow. A lighted circle displays the colour of the line the tram is on. Inside the tram, the floor, walls, and ceiling are coloured blue, and seats and shutters are made of wood.

Operation 
The tram network is run by Le Tram, a consortium of Régie des transports de Marseille and Veolia Transport. The proposal to privatize the operation of public transit was unpopular, and resulted in a 46-day transit strike.

Network map

See also 
 Marseille Metro
 Public transport in Marseille
 Trams in France
 List of town tramway systems in France

References

Inline references

Bibliography 
 Histoire des Transports dans le Villes de France, Jean ROBER.  
 Les tramways de Marseille ont cent ans, Jacques Laupiès et Roland Martin. 1st edition: 1975, new edition: .

External links 

  
 Line 68 on MétroPole

Tram transport in France
Rail transport in Marseille
Railway companies established in 1876
1876 establishments in France
Marseille